Erick Raúl Delvalle Martinez (born February 20, 1990), better known by his stage name Alemán, is a Mexican rapper.

Alemán was born and raised in Cabo San Lucas. His solo career began in 2014 on the Homegrown label with his first album Pase de abordar ("Boarding Pass"). His penultimate album, Eclipse, achieved international success, receiving touring support in Mexico, Chile, Argentina, and Spain.

A 2017 article on Mexican rap by Noisey France which highlighted his collaboration with Yoga Fire, "Chapo Guzmán", was later mentioned in a Red Bull promotional piece stating him to be "considered one of the best Spanish-language rappers".

Musical influences 
Alemán grew up listening to 2Pac, Notorious B.I.G., Dr. Dre, 50 Cent, Control Machete, Cartel de Santa, Cypress Hill, Psycho Realm, Terma H Muda, Caballeros del Plan G, El Pinche Brujo, Snoop Dogg, Akwid, Ice Cube and Eminem. His father's love of hip hop inspired Alemán to make his own music, his father was a Breakdancer.

Discography
 Pase de Abordar - 2015
 Rolemos Otro - 2016
 Eclip$e - 2018
 Humo En La Trampa - 2019
 Humo En La Trampa 2 - 2020
 Humo En La Trampa 3 - 2021
 Huracán - 2021

References

1990 births
Living people
Mexican male rappers
People from Cabo San Lucas
21st-century Mexican musicians
MTV Europe Music Award winners